KKRT is an AM sports radio station broadcasting at 900 kHz. Licensed to Wenatchee, Washington, United States, the station serves the Wenatchee  area.  The station is currently owned by Alpha Media LLC, through Alpha Media Licensee LLC, and features programming from ESPN Radio.

KKRT's programming is simulcasted on sister station KWIQ AM 1020 in Moses Lake North, Washington.

History
KKRT has changed its name various times since its debut. KKRT first went on the air as KSGA on the first of July 1985, but changed its call sign to KEYK in early January 1987. On the thirteenth of October 1988, the call sign was changed again to its current name of KKRT when it changed from its classic country format to old standards as "K-Heart".

On occasion, during the early 1990s, KKRT was used as a back-up station to carry Seattle Mariners radio broadcast from KWWW-AM, and later, KZPH when there were conflicts with broadcasts for the Washington State Cougars Football Team and the Seattle SuperSonics.

In 1993, the station dropped the standards format, and carried the audio feed of CNN Headline News. It was rebranded as "CNN AM 900".

In 1996, KKRT became the full time Mariners affiliate, and changed to an all sports format as "SportsRadio 900" carrying programming from One-on-One Sports and ESPN Radio. The station also later picked up the local rights to WSU football (which ended in 2015, when the broadcasts moved to KPQ) and the Sonics (which ended after the 2006–07 season, one year before the relocation to Oklahoma City).

In 2000, KKRT dropped One-on-One and started carrying the entire ESPN Radio schedule.

In 2021, KKRT replaced most of ESPN Radio's weekday programming (from 6-10 AM and 2-6 PM PT) with Brock & Salk and Wyman & Bob from  Seattle Sports 710.

Along with the Mariners, KKRT is the regional affiliate for the Washington Huskies Football Team and the Gonzaga Men's Basketball Team.

References

External links

KRT
Alpha Media radio stations